Alireza Dabir (born September 16, 1977) is the President of Islamic Republic of Iran Wrestling Federation from July 2019. He is an Iranian champion freestyle wrestler. Dabir won a gold medal at the 2000 Olympic Games in Sydney, as well as the World Championship in 1998.  He was a runner-up in 1999, 2001 and 2002. In the 2004 Athens Olympics, Dabir lost all of his matches due to a shoulder injury. He was a member of City Council of Tehran.

Freestyle results

References

External links
 

1977 births
Living people
Olympic wrestlers of Iran
Wrestlers at the 2000 Summer Olympics
Iranian male sport wrestlers
Wrestlers at the 2004 Summer Olympics
Olympic gold medalists for Iran
Asian Games silver medalists for Iran
Olympic medalists in wrestling
Asian Games medalists in wrestling
Wrestlers at the 2002 Asian Games
Iranian sportsperson-politicians
World Wrestling Championships medalists
Medalists at the 2000 Summer Olympics
Progress and Justice Population of Islamic Iran politicians
Medalists at the 2002 Asian Games
Tehran Councillors 2013–2017
Tehran Councillors 2007–2013
Sportspeople from Tehran
Recipients of the Order of Courage (Iran)
World Wrestling Champions